KJIR (91.7 FM) is a radio station broadcasting a Southern Gospel format, with educational and worship programs. Licensed to Hannibal, Missouri, United States, the station serves the areas of Hannibal; Quincy, Illinois; and Keokuk, Iowa.  The station is currently owned by Believers Broadcasting Corporation.

References

External links

Moody Radio affiliate stations
Southern Gospel radio stations in the United States
JIR